Kuranko is a Mande language spoken by approximately 350,000 Kuranko people in Sierra Leone and Guinea. In Guinea it blends into Eastern Maninkakan dialectologically, but the people are ethnically distinct.

References

Mande languages
Languages of Sierra Leone
Languages of Guinea